Carex gifuensis is a tussock-forming species of perennial sedge in the family Cyperaceae. It is native to parts of Korea and Japan.

See also
List of Carex species

References

gifuensis
Taxa named by Adrien René Franchet
Plants described in 1895
Flora of Korea
Flora of Japan